Konstantin Kersting, is a multi ARIA award winning producer, songwriter and sound engineer. He has worked with a diverse range of artists, including Tones and I, Milky Chance, Mallrat, Spacey Jane, Amy Shark, The Jungle Giants, The Rubens, R3HAB, The Church, Genesis Owusu, Budjerah, Kita Alexander and Peach PRC.

Career
Konstantin Kersting began learning the violin via the Suzuki method at the age of four, before picking up bass guitar and double bass in his teens and playing with orchestras and jazz ensembles around his hometown of Berlin.
In 2007, Kersting relocated to Australia as a teenage exchange student. After earning a Bachelor of Music from Queensland University of Technology, Kersting commenced working as an in-house sound engineer at Airlock Studios, under the producer Yanto Browning. In 2015, Kersting produced the debut extended play Holy Sick by Australian rock band Waax and Snap EP by The Vernons.
In 2017, Kersting co-wrote and produced Mallrat's "Better" which won Best Unpublished Work in the Vanda & Young Songwriting Competition in 2018. In May 2018, Kersting was signed to Independent publisher Native Tongue.
In 2019, Kersting re-worked a number of Sunnyboys' tracks for their compilation album, 40. In September 2019, Kersting received two nominations at the ARIA Music Awards of 2019 for Tones and I's "Dance Monkey". In 2021, Kersting co-produced and mixed 7 songs on The Rubens album "0202", which debuted at #1 on the ARIA charts.In the same year he also mixed and engineered on the #1 ARIA charting album ‘Love Signs’ by Australian band The Jungle Giants. That year he went on to win the ARIA award for Producer of the Year and Engineer of the Year. In 2022, Konstantin produced 8 songs on the #1 ARIA charting album ‘Here Comes Everybody’ by Australian band Spacey Jane.

Discography

Awards and nominations

ARIA Music Awards

References

External links
 

21st-century Australian male musicians
21st-century Australian musicians
ARIA Award winners
Australian people of German descent
Living people
Musicians from Brisbane
University of Queensland alumni
Year of birth missing (living people)